The Roman Catholic Diocese of Paulo Afonso is a diocese located in the city of Paulo Afonso in the Ecclesiastical province of Feira de Santana in Brazil.

History
 September 14, 1971: Established as Diocese of Paulo Afonso from the Diocese of Bonfim

Leadership
 Bishops of Paulo Afonso (Roman rite)
 Bishop Jackson Berenguer Prado (1971.10.08 – 1983.08.17)
 Bishop Aloysio José Leal Penna, S.J. (1984.05.21 – 1987.10.30), appointed Coadjutor Bishop of Bauru, São Paulo; future Archbishop
 Bishop Mário Zanetta (1988.06.15 – 1998.11.13)
 Bishop Esmeraldo Barreto de Farias, Ist. del Prado (2000.03.22 – 2007.02.28), appointed Bishop of Santarém, Para
 Bishop Guido Zendron (2008.03.12 – present)

References
 GCatholic.org
 Catholic Hierarchy
  Diocese website (Portuguese)

Roman Catholic dioceses in Brazil
Christian organizations established in 1971
Paulo Afonso, Roman Catholic Diocese of
Roman Catholic dioceses and prelatures established in the 20th century